Joyce Ann Tyldesley (born 25 February 1960) is a British archaeologist and Egyptologist, academic, writer and broadcaster who specialises in the women of ancient Egypt.

Life 

Tyldesley was born in Bolton, Lancashire and attended Bolton School. In 1981 she earned a first-class honours degree in the archaeology of the Eastern Mediterranean from Liverpool University. Her doctoral studies were undertaken at Oxford University; first at St Anne's College then, following the award of a scholarship, at St Cross College. In 1986 she was awarded a doctorate in Prehistoric Archaeology from Oxford University. Her thesis was written about Mousterian bifaces (handaxes) in Northern Europe. Tyldesley then joined the staff of Liverpool University, teaching Prehistoric Archaeology.

Tyldesley then worked as a freelance Egyptologist/archaeologist; writing books, working with television companies, and teaching in further and higher education and online. Tyldesley has 2 children, Philippa and Jack. Philippa works as a civil servant, and her son Jack is a freelance wall-painting conservator who also works for the Royal Institute of British Architects.

In 2007 Tyldesley joined the University of Manchester, working as a joint appointment between the Manchester Museum and the Faculty of Life Sciences. She is currently Professor of Egyptology in the Department of Classics, Ancient History, Archaeology and Egyptology where she is tutor and Programme Director of the three-year online Certificate in Egyptology programme, the two-year online Diploma in Egyptology programme and the two year part-time online MA in Egyptology programme. She has devised, writes, directs and teaches a suite of on-line Short Courses in Egyptology, and has created several free online Egyptology courses (MOOCS), working in conjunction with the Manchester Museum. Mumford the Mummy is a series of lessons aimed at Key Stage 2 primary school children, freely available via Nearpod.

In 2011 Tyldesley was awarded an honorary doctorate by the University of Bolton in recognition of her contribution to education. She is a Senior Fellow of the Higher Education Academy (HEA) and a Research Associate of the Manchester Museum. Tyldesley is President of Bolton Archaeology and Egyptology Society and a former trustee of the Egypt Exploration Society.

Tyldesley has extensive archaeological fieldwork experience, having excavated in Britain, Europe and Egypt where she worked with the British Museum at Ashmunein, with Liverpool University in the Eastern Nile Delta, and where she conducted her own field survey at Tuna el-Gebel.

Accountancy and Rutherford Press Limited 
Tyldesley is a part-qualified Chartered Accountant, and spent 17 years supporting her writing career by working as small business manager for Crossley and Davis Chartered Accountants in Bolton.

In 2004 Tyldesley established, with Dr. Steven Snape, Rutherford Press Limited, a publishing firm dedicated to publishing serious but accessible books on ancient Egypt while raising money for Egyptology field work. Donations from RPL totaling £3,000 were made to Manchester Museum, the Egypt Exploration Society and the Liverpool University fieldwork project at Zawiyet umm el-Rakham. Rutherford Press closed in February 2017, to allow Tyldesley to concentrate on her teaching.

Writings 

Tyldesley has written a wide variety of academic and popular books for adults and children, including books to accompany the television series Private Lives of the Pharaohs (Channel 4), Egypt's Golden Empire (Lion Television) and Egypt (BBC). In January 2008 book Cleopatra: Last Queen of Egypt, was the Book of the Week on BBC Radio 4. Her play for children, The Lost Scroll, premiered at Kendal Museum in 2011. Her book Tutankhamen's Curse (published as Tutankhamen in the USA) was awarded the 2014 Felicia A. Holton Book Award by the Archaeological Institute of America.

Bibliography (authored books only)

The Wolvercote Channel Handaxe Assemblage: A Comparative Study (Oxford: British Archaeological Reports, 1986)
The Bout Coupe Biface: a Typological Problem (Oxford: British Archaeological Reports, 1987)
Nazlet Tuna: An Archaeological Survey in Middle Egypt (with Steven Snape) (Oxford: British Archaeological Reports, 1988)
Daughters of Isis: Women of Ancient Egypt (London: Viking/Penguin, 1994)
Hatchepsut: The Female Pharaoh (London: Viking/Penguin, 1996)
Nefertiti: Egypt's Sun Queen (London: Viking/Penguin, 1999)
The Mummy: Unwrap the Ancient Secrets of the Mummy's Tombs (London: Carlton Books Ltd., 1999)
Ramesses: Egypt's Greatest Pharaoh (London: Viking/Penguin, 2000)
Judgement of the Pharaoh: Crime and Punishment in Ancient Egypt (London: Weidenfeld & Nicolson, 2000)
The Private Lives of the Pharaohs (London: Channel 4 Books, 2000)
Egypt's Golden Empire: The Age of the New Kingdom (London: Headline, 2001)
Tales from Ancient Egypt (Rutherford Press Ltd., 2001)
Pyramids: The Real Story behind Egypt's most Ancient Monuments (London: Viking/Penguin, 2003)
Unearthing the Past (with Paul Bahn and Douglas Palmer) (London: Mitchell Beazley, 2005)
Egypt: How a Lost Civilization was Rediscovered Companion book, (London: BBC Books, 2005)
Chronicle of the Queens of Egypt (London: Thames & Hudson Ltd., 2006)
Egyptian Games and Sports (Princes Risborough: Shire Books, 2007)
INSIDERS: Egypt (Ancient Egypt Revealed) (Templar, 2007)
Mummy Mysteries: The Secret World of Tutankhamun and the Pharaohs (London: Carlton Books Ltd., 2007)
Cleopatra: Last Queen of Egypt (London: Profile Books Ltd., 2008)
The Pharaohs (London: Quercus, 2009)
Myths and Legends of Ancient Egypt (London: Viking/Penguin, 2010)
Stories from Ancient Greece and Rome (Oxbow Books, 2017)
Tutankhamen's Curse: The Developing History of an Egyptian King (London: Profile Books Ltd., 2012) (published in the USA as Tutankhamen) 
Stories from Ancient Egypt: Egyptian Myths and Legends for Children (Oxbow Books, 2012)
Nefertiti's Face: The Creation of an Icon (London: Profile Books Ltd., 2018)
From Mummies to Microchips: A Case Study in Online Learning (with Nicky Nielsen) (Routledge 2020)

References

External links
Joyce Tyldesley's University of Manchester page
Egyptology Online Website
Interview with Tyldesley on "New Books in Biography"

People from Bolton
Living people
English archaeologists
People educated at Bolton School
British women archaeologists
1960 births
Alumni of the University of Oxford